The British Sports Journalism Awards is an annual ceremony organised by the Sports Journalists' Association that recognise the best of sports journalism in Britain in the previous calendar year. The awards are widely considered the BAFTAs of the industry, and attract entries from all major domestic and international media outlets.

History 
The first edition of the awards was held in 1976 with the Sports Writer of the Year given to celebrated journalists Ian Wooldridge and Hugh McIlvanney. More categories across broadcast and print have been added over the years. The ceremony is held at a gala dinner in London every February.

Principal categories that have held constant since the awards' inception include the John Bromley Sportswriter of the Year, Sports Photographer of the Year, Sports Newspaper of the Year, and the Doug Gardner Award for outstanding contributions to the SJA.

Categories 

 John Bromley Sportswriter of the Year

 Ed Lacey Trophy for the Sports Photographer of the Year

 Sports Newspaper of the Year

 Doug Gardner Award

 Sports Newspaper of the Year

 Broadcast Sports Presenter

 Broadcast Journalist

 Television Sport Live Broadcast

 Radios Sport Live Broadcast

 Television Sport Documentary

 Radio Sport Documentary

 Best Special Package

 Laureus Sports Website

 Specialist Sports Website

 Sports Scoop

 Specialist Correspondent

 Investigative Sports Reporter

 Sports Columnist

 Sports Feature Writer

 Sports News Reporter

 Cricket Writer

 Football Writer

 Rugby Writer

 Regional Writer

 Young Sports Writer

 David Welch Student Sports Writer (discontinued from 2018)

 Sports Picture

 Sports Portfolio

 Specialist Sports Portfolio

 Sports News Picture

Repeat Recipients 
Notable repeat recipients of the British Sports Journalism Awards include Hugh McIlvanney of The Sunday Times and Martin Samuel of The Daily Mail who have both won Sports Writer of the Year six times. Eamonn McCabe was Sports Photographer four times, while Matt Lawton was Sports News Reporter of the Year four times. Paul Hayward has been named Sports Writer of the Year three times in four years.

Michael Atherton of The Times has won all four editions of Cricket Journalist, while Daniel Taylor of The Guardian has won three editions of Football Journalist of the Year. Sean Ingle, also of The Guardian, has won Specialist Correspondent on two occasions.

References

External links 

 British Sports Journalism Awards on Twitter

British journalism awards
Sports journalism
1976 establishments in the United Kingdom
Awards established in 1976